Tallahaga Creek is a stream in the U.S. state of Mississippi.

Tallahaga is a name derived from the Choctaw language meaning "standing rock"; this name was applied to the stream due to a rock formation on its course. Variant names are "Standing Stone Creek", "Talla Haga Creek", "Tallahag Creek", and "Tallahoga Creek".

References

Rivers of Mississippi
Rivers of Choctaw County, Mississippi
Rivers of Neshoba County, Mississippi
Rivers of Winston County, Mississippi
Mississippi placenames of Native American origin